Sunnyboys  were an Australian power pop band formed in Sydney in 1979. Fronted by singer-songwriter/guitarist Jeremy Oxley, the band began performing on the city's pub circuit – where, according to music historian Ian Mc Farlane, they "breathed some freshness and vitality into the divergent Sydney scene". Their first two albums, Sunnyboys and Individuals, both appeared in the Top 30 of the Australian Kent Music Report Albums Chart.

Sunnyboys first broke up in June of 1984. Jeremy Oxley then formed various incarnations of the band throughout the 1980s and into 1991 as the only original member. Three quarters of the original line-up then reunited for a one-off show in 1998 for the Mushroom 25 Concert. In 2012, the original line-up reunited for a surprise show in Sydney as part of the Dig It Up concert series, billed as "Kids in Dust".  The original line-up of Sunnyboys later played sporadic shows in 2013 and continued to tour periodically for the rest of the decade. In September 2022, the band announced their impending split following a farewell tour in early 2023. They played their final show at the Enmore Theatre in Sydney on 18 February 2023.

History

1979–1984: Australian success
Brothers Jeremy and Peter Oxley and Bil Bilson came from the northern New South Wales town of Kingscliff where they played in a garage band called Wooden Horse. Richard Burgman (Kamikaze Kids) came from Wagga Wagga.  Peter Oxley, Bil Bilson and Richard Burgman met in Sydney in 1979 and formed a band with Penny Ward, Shy Imposters, which broke up in early 1980.  (Phantom Records released a posthumous single  "At the Barrier" (PH-6) in 1981).  Joined by Jeremy Oxley, they formed a new band, Sunnyboys. The band's name came from a Sunnyboy, an orange-flavoured water ice in a tetrahedron shaped 'tetra-pack'. According to Richard Burgman, the band chose the name because it represented 'bright, happy, young, fun'.  The band's first public performance was on 15 August 1980, supporting The Lipstick Killers and Me 262, and it quickly became popular in the Sydney band scene.

In October 1980 Sunnyboys recorded four songs produced by Lobby Loyde. These tracks, "Love to Rule", "The Seeker", "What You Need" and "Alone With You", appeared on the band's self-titled and independently released EP on Phantom Records in December 1980. The initial pressing of 1,000 copies sold out in two weeks.  The EP was later remixed and reissued as a 12" EP (PH-11).

Sunnyboys signed to Mushroom Records in February 1981, becoming the first Sydney-based band on the label. Their first single, "Happy Man", was released in July 1981 and peaked at number 26 on the national chart. The same month they made an independent EP entitled Happy Birthday, this was given away at gigs.

Sunnyboys' eponymous debut album was recorded at Alberts Studio in Sydney between May and July 1981 with producer/mentor Lobby Loyde.  The album peaked at number 13 on the national charts in October 1981. A second single was lifted from the album, a re-recorded version of "Alone With You", which peaked at number 28.

The band recorded their second album, Individuals, in New Zealand in the midst of their heavy touring schedule. Individuals was released in May 1982, peaking at number 19.  The album's lead single "You Need a Friend" peaked at number 38.

In 1983, Sunnyboys went to the United Kingdom to record their third studio album. Get Some Fun was released in April 1984 which peaked at number 36. The singles released from the album were "Show Me Some Discipline" (June 1983; peaked at number 44); "Love in a Box" and "Comes as No Surprise". Internal dissent plagued the band; Jeremy Oxley was battling mental illness and drinking heavily as a result. Sunnyboys announced their break-up in June 1984. Their farewell tour produced the album Sunnyboys Real Live, recorded over two nights in Sydney (29 and 30 June), which was released in November 1984.

1985–2000: Post-original line-ups and RCA revival
Following the demise of Sunnyboys, Jeremy Oxley launched a new band called Chinless Elite. Shortly thereafter he formed another group, called Fishermen. This band released one single entitled "Can't You Stop?" on the Waterfront label. Richard Burgman joined The Saints and ultimately Weddings Parties Anything. He later emigrated to Canada. Peter Oxley and Bil Bilson formed the soul band The Sparklers with another Oxley sibling, Melanie.

In late 1987, Jeremy Oxley attempted to revive Sunnyboys with a new line-up. The new band signed a deal with RCA and released an album entitled Wildcat (produced by ex-Sherbet keyboard player, Garth Porter). Four singles were released from the album, which peaked at number 63 on the ARIA Charts. This incarnation of the band broke up in 1989.

In July 1991, Mushroom released the compilation album Play the Best and the original line-up reunited for a national tour.
Following this, Jeremy Oxley played further solo shows. At the same time, Sydney promoter John Denison assembled yet another lineup of Sunnyboys, with Jeremy Oxley as the sole original member. This line-up played only a few gigs as Sunnyboys, after widespread audience discontent, and a dispute over the right to use the name. The group then played a handful of gigs as the "Jeremy Oxley Band", performing Sunnyboys songs, and the songs that later appeared on an EP credited to Jeremy "Ponytail" Oxley, titled "A Little Bit of You in Me". 
Oxley's management replaced the musicians in the "live" Jeremy Oxley Band for the recording of the EP.

In November 1998 the band reformed for the Mushroom 25 Concert at the Melbourne Cricket Ground to celebrate the 25th anniversary of Mushroom Records, organised by Michael Gudinski. For the concert Burgman was replaced by Jeremy and Peter's younger brother Tim Oxley on guitar. Sunnyboys appeared on the original VHS release of the concert and the 2002 re-release CD and DVD. In October 2010, their 1981 debut album, Sunnyboys, was listed in the top 40 in the book, 100 Best Australian Albums.

2012–2023: Periodic touring and farewell tour
In April 2012, the original line-up of the band played as part of the Dig It Up concert series organised by the Hoodoo Gurus, at the Enmore Theatre in Sydney, Australia. The band was listed on the bill as "Kids in Dust". They played a 45-minute set that featured songs drawn mostly from the first self-titled album. An audio-visual recording of the performance was later released on DVD, Sunnyboys: Dig It Up! Live at the Enmore Theatre 22.4.12 (Feel DVD002).

In July 2012 it was announced that the original line-up would be playing at the 2012 Meredith Music Festival on 7 December. The following night they played a show at the Corner Hotel in Melbourne, which sold out in under an hour. In late January and early February 2013, they supported Elvis Costello and the Imposters on their Australian tour. On 2 June they played a sold out performance at the Concert Hall of the Sydney Opera House.

In December 2013, Warner Music Australia released Our Best Of, a 16-track retrospective featuring remastered songs and rarities. In March 2014, the band undertook a national headline tour and again in March 2015, In March 2016, the band played as part of the 'A Day on the Green' concert series with Hoodoo Gurus, Violent Femmes, Died Pretty and Ratcat.

In 2020, Sunnyboys celebrated 40 years since their inception by releasing 40 in November 2019. The album brought together the first ever re-release of the band's 1980 eponymous debut 7" (featuring the original version of "Alone with You") alongside four new recordings from the archives of chief songwriter Jeremy Oxley.

In September 2022, the group announced their 2023 Australian tour would be the band's last.

Members

Sunnyboys

Final line-up
 Jeremy Oxley – lead vocals, lead guitar (1980–1984, 1987–1989, 1991, 1998, 2012–2023)
 Peter Oxley – bass, backing and occasional lead vocals (1980–1984, 1991, 1998, 2012–2023)
 Bil Bilson – drums (1980–1984, 1991, 1998, 2012–2023)
 Richard Burgman – rhythm guitar, backing vocals (1980–1984, 1991, 2012–2023)

Former members
 Nick Freedman – rhythm guitar (1987–1989)
 Tim Freedman – keyboards (1987)
 Peter Hincenbergs – drums (1987–1989)
 Phil Smith – bass (1987–1989)
 Tim Oxley – rhythm guitar (1998)

Touring musicians
 Alister Spence – keyboards, piano (2013–2023)

Jeremy Oxley Band (briefly also billed as Sunnyboys)
 Jeremy Oxley – lead vocals, lead guitar
 Tony "Scarlett" Luvara – rhythm guitar, backing vocals
 Matt Cuneo – rhythm and lead guitar 
 Graham Robbins – bass, backing vocals 
 Tim Williams – drums

Discography

Studio albums

Live albums

Compilation albums

Extended plays

Singles

References

External links
Sunnyboys Fan Club Facebook page
Faster Louder Interview with Peter Oxley (24 September 2004)

Musical groups established in 1980
New South Wales musical groups
People from Wagga Wagga
Australian power pop groups
Australian post-punk groups